Pedro Veniss (born 6 January 1983) is a Brazilian show jumping rider. He participated at two Summer Olympics (in 2008 and 2016). His best Olympic results came in 2016, when he finished 5th in team and 16th in individual competition at the home Olympics in Rio de Janeiro.

Veniss competed at two World Equestrian Games (in 2010 and 2014). He finished 4th in the team competition in 2010, while his best individual placement is 35th place from both 2010 and 2014. Veniss also participated at two Pan American Games (in 2007 and 2015). In 2007 he helped the Brazilian team to win a team gold medal.

References 

1983 births
Living people
Equestrians at the 2008 Summer Olympics
Equestrians at the 2016 Summer Olympics
Olympic equestrians of Brazil
Equestrians at the 2007 Pan American Games
Equestrians at the 2015 Pan American Games
Equestrians at the 2019 Pan American Games
Brazilian male equestrians
Pan American Games medalists in equestrian
Pan American Games gold medalists for Brazil
Medalists at the 2019 Pan American Games
Equestrians at the 2020 Summer Olympics
20th-century Brazilian people
21st-century Brazilian people